Ash Grove may refer to:

The Ash Grove, a Welsh folk song.
Ash Grove (music club) in Los Angeles, California, United States
Ash Grove (plantation) in Fairfax County, Virginia, United States
Ash Grove Cement Company in Overland Park, Kansas, United States
Ash Grove, Indiana, United States
Ash Grove, Kansas, United States
Ash Grove, Missouri, United States
Ash Grove Township, Iroquois County, Illinois, United States
Ash Grove Township, Shelby County, Illinois, United States
Ash Grove, Wrexham, Wales